Infrasexum is a 1969 American sexploitation film written, produced, edited and directed by Carlos Tobalina in his directorial debut. It stars Erroff Lynn as Peter Allison, an impotent middle-aged business executive who leaves his job and wife in search of liberation. The film's cast also includes Tobalina, Marsha Jordan, Maria Pia, William Larrabure, and Sharon Matt.

Cast
 Erroff Lynn as Peter Allison
 Carlos Tobalina as Carlos
 Marsha Jordan as Mrs. Allison
 Maria Pia as Lisa
 Vincent Barbi as Kidnapper
 Anita de Moulin as Rosina
 Luis Varga as Louis - Kidnapper's Accomplice
 Kathy Ferrick as Brunette Woman
 William Larrabure as Dr. Davis
 Sharon Matt as Lori the Nude Model

Critical reception
Lee Pfeiffer of Cinema Retro called the film "downright weird", writing: "Whatever early talent Tobalina might have conveyed on screen is compromised by the bare bones production budget, which was probably close to zero." He noted that the film would likely appeal to "baby boomer males who want a trip back in time to an era in which such fare was considered daring and controversial", and to fans of cult sexploitation films.

Lawsuits
Infrasexum was brought to court in the state of Colorado on the charge of being "obscene material", but the court sided with defendant Tobalina. In response to the case, Tobalina filed a counterclaim against the prosecution, which included the mayor, state attorney general, and governor of Denver.

On June 27, 1970, manager Asa Lloyd Peoples and projectionist Gerald L. Brooke were arrested for screening Infrasexum in a Birmingham, Alabama movie theater. They were claimed to have violated two city ordinances regarding obscene material, and the film was seized and held as evidence to be used in their prosecution. Peoples, Brooke, and the company that owned the theater filed a lawsuit in federal district court, alleging that the ordinances in question were unconstitutional on account of their vague and broad natures, and for not providing accused parties with a proper hearing prior to their arrest or the material's seizure. The district court decided that Brooke would be enjoined from prosecution.

Home media
In 2016, the film was restored in 2K and released on DVD by Vinegar Syndrome.

References

External links
 

1970s exploitation films
American sexploitation films
Films set in the Las Vegas Valley
Obscenity controversies in film
1970s English-language films
1960s English-language films
1960s American films
1970s American films